Gorilla press may refer to:
Gorilla press slam, a type of throw used in professional wrestling
Military press, a weight training exercise utilizing a similar motion as the gorilla press